Luke Shipstad, better known by his stage name Kuuro (stylised in all caps), is an American DJ and electronic music producer. The Kuuro project was formerly a production duo that also included Dutch producer Jordin Post. They revealed themselves as the producers behind the name in May 2017 during an episode of Monstercat's Call of the Wild radio program.

In April 2020, Jordin announced his departure from Kuuro to focus on a solo endeavor.

Discography

Extended plays 
 Bad Habits (2019, Monstercat)

Singles 
 "Aamon" (2016, Monstercat)
 "Fade to Black" (2016, Self-released)
 "Savage" (2017, Monstercat)
 "Bandit" (2017, Monstercat)
 "Possession" (2017, Monstercat)
 "Rapture"  (2017, Monstercat)
 "Swarm" (2017, Monstercat)
 "Doji" (2017, Monstercat)
 "Swarm VIP" (2017, Monstercat)
 "Omen" (2018, Monstercat)
 "Afraid of the Dark"  (2018, Monstercat)
 "Knockin'" (2018, Monstercat)
 "Take Me Down"  (2018, Monstercat)
 "1000 Cuts"  (2018, Monstercat)
 "What U Wanna Do"  (2018, Monstercat)
 "Inferno" (2019, Self-released)
 "Replicant"  (2019, RAM Records, Only in Dreams)
 "Trigger" (2019, Monstercat)
 "Can We Be Free" (2019, Monstercat)
 "Fallout" (2019, Welcome Records)
 "All Night"  (2019, Monstercat)
 "Greed"  (2020, Musical Freedom)
 "Slap!" (2020, Night Mode)
 "Warning Signs"  (2020, Monstercat)
 "She's Got a Gun"  (2020, Monstercat)
 "Crash & Burn" (2020, Monstercat)
 "Don't Stop" (2020, Monstercat)
 "Close To Hell"  (2021, Monstercat)
 "Can't Say"  (2021, Monstercat)
 "Collapse"  (2021, Monstercat)
"Waiting"  (2021, Monstercat)
"D.E.A.L"  (2021, Monstercat)

Remixes and covers 
 Galantis – "Louder, Harder, Better"  (2016)
 What So Not and Burns – "Trust"  (2017)
 Boombox Cartel – "Dem Fraid"  (2017)
 Post Malone – "Better Now"  (2019)
 Zedd and Katy Perry – "365"  (2019)

References 

Monstercat artists
American electronic musicians